Savinsky (masculine), Savinskaya (feminine), or Savinskoye (neuter) is the name of several inhabited localities in Russia.

Arkhangelsk Oblast
As of 2010, thirteen inhabited localities in Arkhangelsk Oblast bear this name.

Urban localities
Savinsky, Arkhangelsk Oblast, a work settlement in Plesetsky District

Rural localities
Savinskoye, Arkhangelsk Oblast, a selo under the administrative jurisdiction of Savinsky Urban-Type Settlement with Jurisdictional Territory, Plesetsky District
Savinskaya, Tikhmangsky Selsoviet, Kargopolsky District, Arkhangelsk Oblast, a village in Tikhmangsky Selsoviet of Kargopolsky District
Savinskaya, Usachevsky Selsoviet, Kargopolsky District, Arkhangelsk Oblast, two villages in Usachevsky Selsoviet of Kargopolsky District
Savinskaya, Krasnoborsky District, Arkhangelsk Oblast, two villages in Cherevkovsky Selsoviet of Krasnoborsky District
Savinskaya, Nyandomsky District, Arkhangelsk Oblast, a village in Lepshinsky Selsoviet of Nyandomsky District
Savinskaya, Primorsky District, Arkhangelsk Oblast, a village in Koskogorsky Selsoviet of Primorsky District
Savinskaya, Puysky Selsoviet, Velsky District, Arkhangelsk Oblast, a village in Puysky Selsoviet of Velsky District
Savinskaya, Ust-Velsky Selsoviet, Velsky District, Arkhangelsk Oblast, a village in Ust-Velsky Selsoviet of Velsky District
Savinskaya, Verkhneustkuloysky Selsoviet, Velsky District, Arkhangelsk Oblast, a village in Verkhneustkuloysky Selsoviet of Velsky District
Savinskaya, Vinogradovsky District, Arkhangelsk Oblast, a village in Morzhegorsky Selsoviet of Vinogradovsky District

Irkutsk Oblast
As of 2010, one rural locality in Irkutsk Oblast bears this name:
Savinskaya, Irkutsk Oblast, a village in Cheremkhovsky District

Ivanovo Oblast
As of 2010, two rural localities in Ivanovo Oblast bear this name:
Savinskaya, Puchezhsky District, Ivanovo Oblast, a village in Puchezhsky District
Savinskaya, Vichugsky District, Ivanovo Oblast, a village in Vichugsky District

Kaluga Oblast
As of 2010, one rural locality in Kaluga Oblast bears this name:
Savinskoye, Kaluga Oblast, a village in Babyninsky District

Republic of Karelia
As of 2010, one rural locality in the Republic of Karelia bears this name:
Savinskaya, Republic of Karelia, a village in Medvezhyegorsky District

Khabarovsk Krai
As of 2010, one rural locality in Khabarovsk Krai bears this name:
Savinskoye, Khabarovsk Krai, a selo in Ulchsky District

Kostroma Oblast
As of 2010, two rural localities in Kostroma Oblast bear this name:
Savinskoye, Kostroma Oblast, a village in Raslovskoye Settlement of Sudislavsky District
Savinskaya, Kostroma Oblast, a village in Georgiyevskoye Settlement of Mezhevskoy District

Leningrad Oblast
As of 2010, one rural locality in Leningrad Oblast bears this name:
Savinskaya, Leningrad Oblast, a village in Vinnitskoye Settlement Municipal Formation of Podporozhsky District

Moscow Oblast
As of 2010, two rural localities in Moscow Oblast bear this name:
Savinskaya, Orekhovo-Zuyevsky District, Moscow Oblast, a village in Belavinskoye Rural Settlement of Orekhovo-Zuyevsky District
Savinskaya, Shatursky District, Moscow Oblast, a village in Dmitrovskoye Rural Settlement of Shatursky District

Smolensk Oblast
As of 2010, one rural locality in Smolensk Oblast bears this name:
Savinskoye, Smolensk Oblast, a village in Pigulinskoye Rural Settlement of Kholm-Zhirkovsky District

Republic of Tatarstan
As of 2010, one rural locality in the Republic of Tatarstan bears this name:
Savinsky, Republic of Tatarstan, a settlement in Alexeyevsky District

Tver Oblast
As of 2010, two rural localities in Tver Oblast bear this name:
Savinskoye, Tver Oblast, a village in Torzhoksky District
Savinskaya, Tver Oblast, a village in Kalyazinsky District

Vladimir Oblast
As of 2010, one rural locality in Vladimir Oblast bears this name:
Savinskaya, Vladimir Oblast, a village in Gus-Khrustalny District

Volgograd Oblast
As of 2010, one rural locality in Volgograd Oblast bears this name:
Savinsky, Volgograd Oblast, a khutor in Dobrinsky Selsoviet of Surovikinsky District

Vologda Oblast
As of 2010, eleven rural localities in Vologda Oblast bear this name:
Savinskoye, Kirillovsky District, Vologda Oblast, a village in Nikolo-Torzhsky Selsoviet of Kirillovsky District
Savinskoye, Sheksninsky District, Vologda Oblast, a village in Ugolsky Selsoviet of Sheksninsky District
Savinskoye, Velikoustyugsky District, Vologda Oblast, a village in Orlovsky Selsoviet of Velikoustyugsky District
Savinskaya, Babayevsky District, Vologda Oblast, a village in Timoshinsky Selsoviet of Babayevsky District
Savinskaya, Kharovsky District, Vologda Oblast, a village in Mikhaylovsky Selsoviet of Kharovsky District
Savinskaya, Syamzhensky District, Vologda Oblast, a village in Ustretsky Selsoviet of Syamzhensky District
Savinskaya, Tarnogsky District, Vologda Oblast, a village in Verkhovsky Selsoviet of Tarnogsky District
Savinskaya, Verkhovazhsky District, Vologda Oblast, a village in Sibirsky Selsoviet of Verkhovazhsky District
Savinskaya, Maryinsky Selsoviet, Vozhegodsky District, Vologda Oblast, a village in Maryinsky Selsoviet of Vozhegodsky District
Savinskaya, Tiginsky Selsoviet, Vozhegodsky District, Vologda Oblast, a village in Tiginsky Selsoviet of Vozhegodsky District
Savinskaya, Vozhegodsky Selsoviet, Vozhegodsky District, Vologda Oblast, a village in Vozhegodsky Selsoviet of Vozhegodsky District

Yaroslavl Oblast
As of 2010, nine rural localities in Yaroslavl Oblast bear this name:
Savinskoye, Bolsheselsky District, Yaroslavl Oblast, a village in Blagoveshchensky Rural Okrug of Bolsheselsky District
Savinskoye, Borisoglebsky District, Yaroslavl Oblast, a selo in Vysokovsky Rural Okrug of Borisoglebsky District
Savinskoye, Pervomaysky District, Yaroslavl Oblast, a village in Nikologorsky Rural Okrug of Pervomaysky District
Savinskoye, Poshekhonsky District, Yaroslavl Oblast, a village in Kolodinsky Rural Okrug of Poshekhonsky District
Savinskoye, Rostovsky District, Yaroslavl Oblast, a selo in Savinsky Rural Okrug of Rostovsky District
Savinskoye, Mikhaylovsky Rural Okrug, Rybinsky District, Yaroslavl Oblast, a village in Mikhaylovsky Rural Okrug of Rybinsky District
Savinskoye, Ogarkovsky Rural Okrug, Rybinsky District, Yaroslavl Oblast, a village in Ogarkovsky Rural Okrug of Rybinsky District
Savinskoye, Tutayevsky District, Yaroslavl Oblast, a selo in Pomogalovsky Rural Okrug of Tutayevsky District
Savinskoye, Uglichsky District, Yaroslavl Oblast, a village in Otradnovsky Rural Okrug of Uglichsky District